Friedel's law, named after Georges Friedel, is a property of Fourier transforms of real functions.

Given a real function , its Fourier transform

has the following properties.

Centrosymmetric points  are called Friedel's pairs.

The squared amplitude is centrosymmetric:
 

 .

Friedel's law is used in X-ray diffraction, crystallography and scattering from real potential within the  Born approximation. Note that a twin operation ( Opération de maclage) is equivalent to an inversion centre and the intensities from the individuals are equivalent under Friedel's law.

References

Fourier analysis
Crystallography